Monoplex mundus is a species of predatory sea snail, a marine gastropod mollusk in the family Cymatiidae.

Distribution
This marine species occurs in the Gulf of Mexico and in the Indian Ocean off the Mascarene Basin.

Description 
The maximum recorded shell length is 38 mm.

Habitat 
Minimum recorded depth is 149 m. Maximum recorded depth is 185 m.

References

 Beu A.G. 2010 [August]. Neogene tonnoidean gastropods of tropical and South America: contributions to the Dominican Republic and Panama Paleontology Projects and uplift of the Central American Isthmus. Bulletins of American Paleontology 377-378: 550 pp, 79 pls

External links
 Gould, A. A. (1849). Descriptions of new species of shells, brought home by the U. S. Exploring Expedition. Proceedings of the Boston Society of Natural History. 3: 83-85, 89-92, 106-108, 118-121 (May 1849), 140-144
 Emerson W.K. (1991) First records for Cymatium mundum (Gould) in the Eastern Pacific Ocean, with comments on the zoogeography of the tropical Trans-Pacific tonnacean and non-tonnacean prosobranch gastropods with Indo-Pacific faunal affinities in West American waters. The Nautilus, 105(2):62-80

Cymatiidae
Gastropods described in 1849